Southern Indian Chamber of Commerce and Industry, formerly Southern Indian Chamber of Commerce, is a non-government, not-for-profit, industry-led and industry-managed organisation, whose primary function is to work for the development of industries in South India. It is one of the founder-members of the Federation of Indian Chambers of Commerce and Industry (FICCI)

History 

The Southern Indian Chamber of Commerce was founded with about 100 members, at Ramakoti Buildings, the headquarters of the Indian Bank, on 9 October 1909. South Indian politician Sir P. Theagaraya Chetty was its first President. Some of the important founder-members of the chamber were M. A. Kuddus Badsha Sahib, Lodd Govindoss Chathurbhujadoss, D. V. Hanumant Rao, Pandit Vidya Sagar Pandya, and Jamal Mohammad.

Notes

External links 

 Official website

Organisations based in Chennai
Trade associations based in India
Non-profit organisations based in India
1909 establishments in India
Organizations established in 1909